Feliniopsis tripunctata is a moth in the family Noctuidae. It is found in Taiwan.

The wingspan is 33 mm.

References

Moths described in 1991
Hadeninae